Damian Denis Dallu is the Roman Catholic bishop of the Roman Catholic Diocese of Geita, Tanzania.

He was born on 26 April 1955 in Kiponzelo, Maboga, Iringa Region. On 15 November 1984 he was Ordained Priest of Geita, and was consecrated Bishop of Geita on 30 July 2000, by Cardinal Pengo, Bishop Aloysius Balina and Tarcisius Ngalalekumtwa, On 14 March 2014, he was appointed Archbishop of Songea, Tanzania, and installed on 18 May 2014.

References

Living people
1955 births
Tanzanian Roman Catholic archbishops
People from Iringa Rural District
Roman Catholic bishops of Geita
Roman Catholic archbishops of Songea